A cult of personality developed around the figure of Józef Piłsudski, a Polish military commander and politician, starting with the interwar period and continuing after his death in 1935 until the present day. At first it was propagated by the Polish state's propaganda, describing Piłsudski as a masterful strategist and political visionary. It has survived decades of repression during the communist rule of Poland. In modern Poland, Piłsudski is recognized as an important and largely positive figure in Polish history.

Origins
Piłsudski's popularity, described as a cult of personality, was tied to his role in regaining Polish independence following World War I, and his leadership in the subsequent Polish–Soviet War. He was, however, already a popular figure even before the start of World War I.

Piłsudski seized power in Poland again in 1926, following his May Coup. Piłsudski was not primarily interested in cultivating the cult himself, as this was done by others, particularly after his death. His funeral in 1935 became a major state ceremony, and it became a sign of things to come, as Piłsudski's followers, known as Piłsudskiites, attempted to turn his legend into one of the bases to legitimate their grip on power in the Polish state. Numerous initiatives honoring Piłsudski's name were created; these were so numerous that the Main Committee for Commemorating the Memory of Marshal Józef Piłsudski had to curb some of the more outlandish initiatives (such as the proposal to rename Wilno to Piłsudski's child nickname, Ziuk). In 1938 the Polish parliament passed a decree criminalizing any defamation of Piłsudski.

Piłsudski's cult is tied to Polish Independence Day, as the date of November 11 was also the date of Piłsudski's seizing power for the first time in newly independent Poland. In 1937 Polish parliament officially declared November 11 as a national holiday celebrating regaining independence and stated that "for all time [it should be] associated with the great name of Józef Piłsudski" Initially this celebration of Poland's regaining statehood was also a celebration of Piłsudski and the Polish Army, through that relation has lost some of its strength with the progression of time.

Despite those efforts his cult began to wane shortly after his death, according to some, as early as 1937.

Piłsudski's cult was not universal, and it was opposed by several factions from the very first days of its emergence; the most notable of its early opponents included the endecja political faction, opponent of the pro-Piłsudski sanacja faction. Critics of Piłsudski did face some persecution from the state and its supporters.

In spite of his special sympathy for Piłsudski, Hitler sent Ribbentrop to represent the Reich instead of attending Piłsudski's funeral himself. Hitler had an honour guard set at Piłsudski's grave by the Wehrmacht after it took Kraków. He would later say, after attacking Poland, that things would have turned out differently had Piłsudski still been alive. He had earlier been, to his excitement, congratulated by Piłsudski on winning the 1933 elections.

The cult was particularly strong in the Polish Army. During World War II the Polish Armed Forces in the West continued this tradition, with Piłsudski's memory being highly celebrated, even though many leaders of the Polish government in exile, such as Władysław Sikorski, were opposed to it.

Józef Piłsudski became (still in his lifetime) to a namesake of the Polish Navy's gunboat ORP "Komendant Piłsudski" and of the motor transatlantic liner "Piłsudski" - the latter, built in Italy, was the first Polish modern transatlantic liner, launched in December 1934 and put to service in September 1935.

Later years
Piłsudski's cult was suppressed during the time of communist Poland when the authorities attempted to portray him as a fraud, egoist and even a fascist, responsible for much of the Poland's ills. The fond memory of Piłsudski persisted among the segments of Polish population nonetheless, and he became an important figure for many Solidarity activists, including Lech Wałęsa. Piłsudski was also respected abroad. By the late 1980s the Polish communists changed tack and attempted to integrate Piłsudski's popularity into their own propaganda but to little effect.

At the time of the fall of communism in Poland in 1989, Polish parliament in February that year restored 11 November as the Polish holiday (it was abolished during communist period). In modern Poland Piłsudski is recognized as an important and largely positive figure in Polish history, a patron of numerous streets and institutions. He has been often recognized by Polish public in national surveys as the most influential Polish historical figures since the 1980s (prior data from communist era is not representative), through since the late 1990s he has been supplanted in this ranking by Pope John Paul II. Paweł Kusiak argues that it is the 1990s which represent the Golden Age of Piłsudski's popularity. Piłsudski's cult and legend is still present in Polish political and cultural discourse; for example Piłsudski was declared as the most influential politician by both Donald Tusk and Lech Kaczyński in  the 2005 Polish presidential election, and he was positively referenced by Polish president Bronisław Komorowski in his electoral campaign in 2010. Despite that, there are groups in the modern Polish society who are highly critical of Piłsudski and his legacy.

See also

Piłsudski's colonels
Józef Piłsudski Park

References

Bibliography

Further reading
 
 Cichoracki, Piotr,  Naczelny Komitet Uczczenia Pamięci Marszałka Józefa Piłsudskiego 1935-1939 : mechanizmy działania / Piotr Cichoracki.

Cult of personality
Pilsudski
Pilsudski's cult of personality
Pilsudski's cult of personality